The 2008–09 Frölunda HC season was the club's 29th season in the Swedish elite league Elitserien. The regular season began on 15 September 2008 against rival team HV71, and concluded on 28 February 2009 against Djurgårdens IF. Frölunda looked to improve upon their progress in the 2007–08 season after being eliminated in the first round of the playoffs by Färjestad BK.

Niklas Andersson was named captain of the team after Jonas Johnson retired. Ronnie Sundin continued serving as alternate captain; Tomi Kallio and Riku Hahl were named alternate captains after Jonas Esbjörs had retired.

Pre-season

Nordic Trophy

Standings

Game log

Exhibition game against Ottawa
On 2 October 2008, Frölunda play an exhibition game against the Ottawa Senators. The game was played two days prior to the 2008–09 NHL season premier between Ottawa and the Pittsburgh Penguins in the Stockholm Globe Arena. Ottawa's captain Daniel Alfredsson is a native of Gothenburg and Frölunda is the only other professional team he has represented. Prior to the game Alfredsson was honoured with a decorated pillar in Scandinavium. Frölunda lost the game by a score of 1–4, with Oscar Hedman scoring their only goal. Alfredsson scored the second goal for the Senators, Chris Kelly, Alexandre Picard and Jason Spezza scored the Senators' other three goals in the game.

Regular season

Standings

Game log

Playoffs

Player statistics

Skaters
Note: GP = Games played; G = Goals; A = Assists; Pts = Points; PIM = Penalty minutes

Transactions

Drafted players

Frölunda HC players picked at the 2009 NHL Entry Draft.

References

General

Footnotes

2008-09
2008–09 in Swedish ice hockey